Cefn Croes is a wind farm in Ceredigion, Wales. It is located in the Cambrian Mountains on Cefn Croes mountain, 573m (1,880 ft) south of the A44 road between Aberystwyth and Llangurig, in west Wales. The construction of the wind farm commenced in February 2004, and was completed in the spring of 2005 when the 39 wind turbines started producing electricity. The maximum installed nameplate capacity is 58.5 MW.

Nearby is the HuMP Y Glog (Draws Drum).

References

Wind farms in Wales